Bill Strang may refer to:

Bill Strang (footballer) (1883–1937), Australian rules footballer
Bill Strang (engineer) (1921–1999), British aerospace engineer

See also
William Strang (disambiguation)